Simon John Fairweather, OAM (born 9 October 1969) is an archer born in Adelaide, South Australia.

Fairweather won the individual gold medal at the World Championships in Poland in 1991.

Fairweather was declared the Young Australian of the Year in 1991.

After an early Olympic career in which he was generally considered not to have lived up to his promise, Fairweather shot back into Australia's national consciousness, "stopping the nation" with his gold-medal performance in men's individual archery at the 2000 Summer Olympics. He was also a member of the Australian team which finished twelfth in the team competition.

Simon went to 5 Olympic Games: 1988, 1992, 1996, 2000, 2004. He has won countless Australia titles over a 20-year period.

In 1997, Fairweather gained a degree in jewellery design from the University of South Australia.

In 2002, Fairweather was inducted into the Australian Institute of Sport Best of the Best.

Fairweather was inducted into the Sport Australia Hall of Fame in 2009.

On 1 February 2009, Archery Australia announced the appointment of Fairweather as National Head Coach of Archery in Australia.

Fairweather was married to former triathlon world champion Jackie Fairweather (née Gallagher) until she committed suicide on 2 November 2014.

References

External links
 
 
 
 
 

1969 births
Living people
Australian male archers
Olympic archers of Australia
Archers at the 1988 Summer Olympics
Archers at the 1992 Summer Olympics
Archers at the 1996 Summer Olympics
Archers at the 2000 Summer Olympics
Archers at the 2004 Summer Olympics
Olympic gold medalists for Australia
Sportspeople from Adelaide
Olympic medalists in archery
Australian Institute of Sport archers
Recipients of the Medal of the Order of Australia
Sport Australia Hall of Fame inductees
Medalists at the 2000 Summer Olympics
World Archery Championships medalists